Wizard's Convention: Japanese Heavy Rock Showcase is a split DVD, released on June 6, 2005 by Diwphalanx Records, showcasing four different Japanese heavy metal groups for the Wizard's Convention concert series in Japan. Each band plays some form of music related to metal. Boris play stoner rock, mainly material from Heavy Rocks and Akuma no Uta. Church of Misery play doom metal, mainly material from The Second Coming. Eternal Elysium play stoner metal. Greenmachine play sludge metal, mainly material from The Archive of Rotten Blues.

Track listing

Boris
 "Akuma no Uta"
 "Ibitsu" 
 "Furi"
 "Dyna-soar" 
 "Death Valley" 
 "Korosu"

Church of Misery
 "I, Motherfucker"   
 "Soul Discharge"   
 "Red Ripper Blues"   
 "Filth Bitch Boogie"

Eternal Elysium
 "Twilight High"   
 "Splendid, Selfish Woman"

Greenmachine
 "Black Summer"   
 "Punisher"   
 "Burning Door"   
 "Anima"
 "Fire Never Ends"   
 "Hammer and Burner"

References 

Boris (band) video albums
2005 video albums
Live video albums
Collaborative albums
2005 live albums
Church of Misery albums
Eternal Elysium albums
Greenmachine albums
Diwphalanx Records albums